K139 or K-139 may refer to:

K-139 (Kansas highway), a state highway in Kansas
HMCS Moncton (K139), a former Canadian Navy ship 
Vibrio virus K139, a virus
Mass in C minor, K. 139 "Waisenhaus"